Dantan Assembly constituency is an assembly constituency in Paschim Medinipur district in the Indian state of West Bengal.

Overview
As per orders of the Delimitation Commission, No. 219 Dantan Assembly constituency is composed of the following: Dantan II community development block, Mohanpur community development block, and Chak Islampur gram panchayat of Dantan I community development block.

Dantan Assembly constituency is part of No. 34 Medinipur (Lok Sabha constituency).

Election results

2021
In the 2021 elections, Bikram Chandra Pradhan of Trinamool Congress defeated his nearest rival Shaktipada Nayak of BJP.

2016
In the 2016 elections, Bikram Chandra Pradhan of Trinamool Congress defeated his nearest rival Sisir Kumar Patra of CPI.

2011
In the 2011 elections, Arun Mahapatra of CPI defeated his nearest rival Saibal Giri of Trinamool Congress.

  

.# Swing calculated on Congress+Trinamool Congress vote percentages taken together in 2006.

1977-2006
In the 2006, 2001 and 1996 state assembly elections, Nanda Gopal Bhattacharya of CPI won the Danatan assembly seat, defeating his nearest rivals Bikram Chandra Pradhan of Trinamool Congress in 2006 and 2001, and Sunil Baran Giri of Congress in 1996. Contests in most years were multi cornered but only winners and runners are being mentioned. Ranjit Patra of CPI(M) defeated Panchanan Mahanti of Congress in 1991. Kanai Bhowmick of CPI defeated Dilip Kumar Das of Congress in 1987 and Pradyot Kumar Mahanti of Janata Party in 1982. Pradyot Kumar Mahanti of Janata Party defeated Rabindra Nath Dwibedi of CPI in 1977.

1951-1972
Pradyut Kumar Mahanti of Congress (Organisation) won in 1972. Pulin Behari Tripathi of Congress won in 1971. Debendra Nath Das of Bangla Congress won in 1969 and 1967. Charu Chandra Mahanti of Congress won in 1962 and 1957. In independent India's first election in 1951 Jnanendra Kumar Choudhury of Bharatiya Jana Sangh won the Dantan seat.

References

Assembly constituencies of West Bengal
Politics of Paschim Medinipur district